Tabuchi (written:  or ) is a Japanese surname. Notable people with the surname include:

, Japanese fencer
, Japanese photographer
, Japanese baseball player and manager
, Japanese footballer
, Japanese-American country musician and singer
, Japanese swimmer
, Japanese photographer

Japanese-language surnames